Gylys is a Lithuanian language family name. The word literally means "botfly".

The surname may refer to:
Beth Gylys (born 1964), American poet and professor 
Povilas Gylys, Lithuanian politician

See also
Gilis

 
Lithuanian-language surnames